Malvinne Ann Venice Alcala (born November 5, 1995) is a Filipino badminton player.

Career 
Alcala won three silver medals at the 2008 Palarong Pambansa in the Philippines. In 2011, she competed in the South East Asia Games and was the fifth in the ranking with the team.

References

External links 
 

Filipino female badminton players
1995 births
Living people
Competitors at the 2011 Southeast Asian Games
Southeast Asian Games competitors for the Philippines